Zacorisca pyrocanthara is a species of moth of the family Tortricidae. It is found on New Guinea.

The wingspan is about 35 mm. The forewings are very dark indigo blue, with a coppery-fulvous line in the apical area. The hindwings are blue blackish, with a copper-fulvous terminal fascia occupying.

References

	

Moths described in 1924
Zacorisca